Charles Bennet, 3rd Earl of Tankerville (6 September 1716 – 27 October 1767), styled Lord Ossulston between 1722 and 1753, was a British peer and politician.

Background
Tankerville was the son of Charles Bennet, 2nd Earl of Tankerville, and was educated as a gentleman commoner at Winchester College (around 1731).

Political career
Tankerville was returned to Parliament for Northumberland in 1748, a seat he held until the following year, when he was unseated on petition. In 1753 he succeeded his father in the earldom and took his seat in the House of Lords.

Family
Lord Tankerville married Alice, daughter of Sir John Astley, 2nd Baronet, in 1742. She died in 1755. Tankerville survived her by twelve years and died in October 1767, aged 51. He was succeeded in the earldom by his son, Charles.

References

1716 births
1767 deaths
Earls in the Peerage of Great Britain
Place of birth missing
People educated at Winchester College